Easington is a small village in the civil parish of Cuxham with Easington in South Oxfordshire.

Parish church
The Church of England parish church of Saint Peter was built in the 14th century. It consists of a continuous nave and chancel with no chancel arch between them. The chancel masonry is ashlar, noticeably better-dressed and more evenly coursed than that of the nave. The church building includes a 12th-century Norman doorway re-used from an earlier church on the same site. The font is tub-shaped, suggesting that it too is Norman. The chancel windows are Perpendicular Gothic. The east window has ogee tracery and includes 14th century stained glass. The piscina also is ogeed. Beside the east window on the east wall are the remains of a medieval wall painting. The woodwork of the pulpit and reading desk are Jacobean items carved in the 17th century. The pulpit bears the date 1633 but Sherwood and Pevsner suggest that it was assembled in the 19th century from Jacobean materials. St. Peter's is a Grade II* listed building.

Gallery

References

Sources

External links

Villages in Oxfordshire